Bernard J. Bagert, Jr. (born 1944) is an American attorney and politician.  He served in the Louisiana State House from 1970 to 1984 and the Louisiana State Senate from 1984 to 1992, representing Orleans Parish as a Democrat.

He was a Republican candidate in the 1990 United States Senate election in Louisiana.  He withdrew from the race to prevent David Duke from reaching a runoff election.  He was also a candidate for attorney general in 1991, losing to Richard Ieyoub.

References

Living people
1944 births
Democratic Party members of the Louisiana House of Representatives
Democratic Party Louisiana state senators
20th-century American politicians